Borderline is an extended play (EP) by Swedish pop recording artist Tove Styrke. It is her first release internationally outside of Europe.

Track listing

References

2014 EPs
Pop music EPs
EPs by Swedish artists